The 2005 Brazilian Grand Prix (officially the Formula 1 Grande Prêmio do Brasil 2005) was a Formula One motor race held on at the Autódromo José Carlos Pace in São Paulo, Brazil on 25 September 2005. The 71-lap race was the seventeenth round of the 2005 Formula One season. The race was won by McLaren driver Juan Pablo Montoya, who took the final race victory of his career, ahead of his teammate, Kimi Räikkönen, who finished second. Renault driver Fernando Alonso became the Drivers' Champion for the first time after he finished the race in third place. Only he and Räikkönen had entered the race within mathematical contention of winning the title, and Alonso's podium ensured that he did with two rounds remaining. Alonso also qualified in pole position for the race, but the fastest lap went to Räikkönen.

Friday drivers 
The bottom 6 teams in the 2004 Constructors' Championship were entitled to run a third car in free practice on Friday. These drivers drove on Friday but did not compete in qualifying or the race.

Report

Qualifying
As Takuma Sato was subject to a ten-place grid penalty given for the accident in the Belgian Grand Prix where he crashed into Michael Schumacher, Sato did not attempt a qualifying lap. Jarno Trulli also had a ten-place penalty, in his case the result of an engine change before qualifying. The Italian started from 18th on the grid.

Race
Juan Pablo Montoya won the race ahead of teammate Kimi Räikkönen; McLaren's first 1–2 finish since the 2000 Austrian Grand Prix. Fernando Alonso finished 3rd and thus became World Champion for the first time, at the time the youngest ever champion at 24 years and 58 days surpassing Emerson Fittipaldi's record of 25 years and 273 days set in 1972. Jacques Villeneuve was forced to start from pit lane as a penalty for infringement of parc ferme regulations. After getting involved in an accident at the start of the race, Mark Webber was able to rejoin, over 20 laps behind the leaders and do some laps, sufficient to position himself fourth in the official qualifying order for the subsequent Grand Prix at Suzuka. The result of the Grand Prix marked the only point during the season when McLaren had more championship points than Renault. Due to a driveshaft failure, this was Tiago Monteiro's only retirement of the 2005 season.

Classification 
Commentators have judged Renault's qualifying performance as evidence that their "conservative phase" was over. Renault's Pat Symonds had said that the team was not aiming to settle for a simple podium finish, rather they were aiming to win. BBC's Maurice Hamilton said that "the thought that Fernando Alonso might cruise to the Championship.....was dispelled in the most convincing fashion". McLaren CEO Ron Dennis remained confident of his team's race strategy given Juan Pablo Montoya's strong second position, despite a major error in the qualifying lap of Kimi Räikkönen.

Qualifying

Race

 Monteiro and Villeneuve would start the race from the pitlane.

Championship standings after the race 
Bold text indicates who still has a theoretical chance of becoming World Champion.

Drivers' Championship standings

Constructors' Championship standings

Note: Only the top five positions are included for both sets of standings.

References

Brazilian Grand Prix
Brazilian Grand Prix
Grand Prix
Brazilian Grand Prix